Hatheli (also known as Harsundarpura) is a patwar circle and village in ILRC Nimera in Phagi Tehsil in Jaipur district, Rajasthan. Hatheli is also a patwar circle for nearby villages, Nathmalpura and Ratanpura.

In Hatheli, there are 100 households with total population of 619 (with 53.47% males and 46.53% females), based on 2011 census. Total area of village is 10.94 km2. There is one primary school in Hatheli village.

References 

Villages in Jaipur district